Bo Lindman (8 February 1899 – 30 July 1992) was a Swedish modern pentathlete. He participated at the 1924, 1928 and 1932 Summer Olympics and won one gold and two silver medals; in 1932 he also competed in the individual épée fencing event. Lindman was the Olympic flag bearer for Sweden in 1928, 1932 and 1936.

Lindman was the Nordic Champion in 1923 and Swedish champion in 1923 and 1924 in modern pentathlon. Between 1936 and 1946 he headed the Athletics Federation of Sweden, and in 1949 became treasurer of the Union Internationale de Pentathlon Moderne. Lindman was a career military officer, retiring in the rank of lieutenant colonel. He later became director of the Swedish Transport Association.

References

1899 births
1992 deaths
Swedish male épée fencers
Swedish male modern pentathletes
Olympic fencers of Sweden
Olympic modern pentathletes of Sweden
Fencers at the 1932 Summer Olympics
Modern pentathletes at the 1924 Summer Olympics
Modern pentathletes at the 1928 Summer Olympics
Modern pentathletes at the 1932 Summer Olympics
Olympic gold medalists for Sweden
Olympic silver medalists for Sweden
Olympic medalists in modern pentathlon
Sportspeople from Stockholm
Medalists at the 1932 Summer Olympics
Medalists at the 1928 Summer Olympics
Medalists at the 1924 Summer Olympics
20th-century Swedish people